Morne Nicholls is a mountain in Dominica named after Dominican Sir Henry Alfred Alford Nicholls. The mountain is located on a hiking trail leading to the Valley of Desolation and Boiling Lake.

Morne Nicholls has an elevation of 3,168 feet.

References

Mountains of Dominica